Flavio Cipolla and Dudi Sela were the defending champions, but chose not to participate this year.

Roman Jebavý and Jiří Veselý won the title, defeating Tuna Altuna and Alessandro Motti in the final, 6–0, 6–0.

Seeds

Draw

Draw

References
 Main Draw

Istanbul Open - Doubles
2017 in Istanbul
2017 Doubles
2017 in Turkish tennis